The State Theatre is a single-screen movie theater located in Bay City, Michigan.  Built in 1908 during the booming lumbering era in Michigan, the State Theatre was originally known as the Bijou, and was one of the many vaudeville and burlesque houses in Bay City. In 1930 the theater was renovated and reopened as the "Bay".  The ownership and the name of the theater changed over the years until July 2000, when the theater was purchased by the Bay City Downtown Development Authority who restored the Mayan motif marquee.

History
In September 1908, the Bijou vaudeville theatre opened on Washington Avenue in Downtown Bay City.  In August 1920 the theatre's name was changed to the "Orpheum".
The theater was renovated in 1930 to resemble a Mayan pyramid by renowned architect C. Howard Crane whose impressive body of work includes the twin Fox Theatres in Detroit and St. Louis, Missouri.
Among the theater owners over the years were the Butterfield family who also owned theaters throughout the Flint/Great Lakes Bay region and the Ashman Brothers.

Restoration
Renovations to the theater began in 2000 with the replacement of the roof, carpet, and stage curtains, and seating.  The hardwood floors were refinished, and the lighting and sound systems were updated. A new stage was created in front of the existing screen which enabled the theatre to be used for small productions. The elaborate internal paint theme was restored in 2005.

Digital projector
In August 2008, The State Theatre became the first single-screen theater with a digital projection system in the United States.

New marquee
On September 11, 2008 a new marquee was unveiled.  The new design was created and built by Eric E. Larsen in the  spirit of the theater from the time of the Mayan redesign of 1930.  The $220,000 marquee, with its retro Mayan Indian headdress, digital display, and colorful lighting, is part of a multi-phase project to renovate the theater.

References

External links
 
 

Cinemas and movie theaters in Michigan
Buildings and structures in Bay County, Michigan
Bay City, Michigan
Event venues established in 1908
1908 establishments in Michigan